NOTE: There are differences over names of clubs between the sources. The main source used is Matthews. 

John Richmond Graham, known as Jack Graham (born 1868 – died 1932) was an English footballer who played in the Football League for Aston Villa.

Early Career 
Jack Graham first came to notice as a footballer when, aged 18/19 he signed, as a youth player, for a local Football Club called Smethwick Centaur F.C. (There are no online records about this club)
After one season Graham signed for Oldbury Broadwell F.C.. It is possible (there are no records on this club) that Oldbury Broadwell were a Railway Works Club. There was the Oldbury Carriage & Wagon Co.Ltd. that built rolling stock for the Railways. The Works were on Broadwell Road.  Jack Graham moved to Aston Villa in 1889.

Season 1889-1890
Jack Graham made his Club and League debut and played his only first-team match of the season on 25 January 1890. The venue Wellington Road, the then home of Aston Villa. The visitors were Bolton Wanderers and Bolton won the match 2-1.

Season 1890-1891
1890-1891 was the most successful season for Jack Graham as a League player. Graham played 16 matches (out of 22) in what was a modest season for Aston Villa, finishing ninth. Graham played in the opening League match of the season. It was 6 September 1890 and the match was played at Molineux, the home of Wolverhampton Wanderers. Graham played at Inside Left  and was on the losing side for a 2-1 defeat. Graham started at Inside-Left for Aston Villa' first home game of the season on 13 September 1890. He helped the team to achieve their first win of the campaign and Graham scored his first goal in the League and for the Villa first-team. The visitors were Notts County. The goal is briefly mentioned in the 13 September 1890 edition of the Nottingham Evening Post, page 3. Aston Villa led 2-1 at Half-time. In one sentence the Nottingham Evening Post journalist wrote, "In the second half Graham scored a third goal for Aston Villa (3-1). Notts (County), retaliated, and gained a second point (goal)." Final score 3-2 to Aston Villa. That goal against Notts County was the first of five scored that season. His last League goal was scored on 10 January 1891 at Newcastle Road, the then home of Sunderland. Sunderland won 5-1 and Graham scored Villa' only goal. Graham' best performance for Villa, in terms of goal scoring, was when he scored two in a match. The occasion was an FA Cup First Round tie played at Wellington Road, Perry Barr on 17 January 1891 when the visitors were Casuals. Villa won 13-2 although this was not their record win. The Tony Matthews book confirms that 1890-1891 was Graham best season. Matthews describes Graham as, "an impish footballer". Matthews states that the success was achieved because of a left-sided partnership with Denny Hodgetts.

Season 1891-1892 
Sadly, although 1891-1892 was a good season for Aston Villa, they finished fourth in The League and reached the Final of the FA Cup, Jack Graham was a reserve player and only played one first team match all season. Graham was moved to Centre-Forward for the visit to Ewood Park, Blackburn on 5 March 1892. The match had seven goals and despite a Lewis Campbell hat-trick Aston Villa lost 4-3. It was Graham' last Villa and League appearance.

1893 onwards
Jack Graham stayed at Aston Villa for the 1892-1893 season but never played for the first-team. He left in the August of that year and signed for 
Brierley Hill Alliance. Graham was on the books of Brierley Hill Alliance for nearly two years but in the May of 1895 he moved to Dudley Town. Graham left Dudley Town in April 1897 aged 29. Whether he left for injury or to another club is not recorded in Matthews or online. Nothing further is known about Graham except he passed away in West Bromwich in 1932 aged 63 or 64.

Statistics
Source:

References

English footballers
Aston Villa F.C. players
Brierley Hill Alliance F.C. players
Dudley Town F.C. players
1868 births
1932 deaths
English Football League players
Association football inside forwards